Zare Alievna Yusupova (Russian: Заре Алиевна Юсупова; born 1934) is a Russian philologist specializing in the Kurdish language.

Yusupova holds a Doctor of Philological Sciences degree and works as a professor at the Saint Petersburg State University, where she teaches Kurdish. She has published more than 70 scientific works, including 6 monographs. 

Yusupova's main fields of research are the less studied Kurdish dialects, focusing on Sorani and Hawrami (based on folklore and written materials) and the publication of the classics of the Kurdish literature.

References

Russian orientalists
Russian philologists
Women philologists
Women linguists
1934 births
Living people
Women orientalists